An explanandum (a Latin term) is a sentence describing a phenomenon that is to be explained, and the explanans are the sentences adduced as explanations of that phenomenon. For example, one person may pose an explanandum by asking "Why is there smoke?", and another may provide an explanans by responding "Because there is a fire". In this example, "smoke" is the explanandum, and "fire" is the explanans.

Carl Gustav Hempel and Paul Oppenheim (1948), in their deductive-nomological model of scientific explanation, motivated the distinction between explanans and explanandum in order to answer why-questions, rather than simply what-questions:

References

Concepts in logic
Philosophy of science
Linguistics